Ur is the Basque word for 'water'.

This root may be found in many place names and some derivates as:
 uharre / ugarre 'torrent'
 uhaitz / ugaitz 'torrential river' (French gave).
 urtz-◂ Ourse > Ousse, Urtzaran, Ossau Valley < valis ursaliensis (1127), Oursbelille

House names (thus family names) 
 Uhalde or Ugalde, from ur alde 'water side'; Family names: Duhalde, Uhalt, Duhalt.
 Uharte or Ugarte, from ur arte 'between water' ('between two brooks'; 'island'); Family names: Duhart, Duarte.

River names (thus village names) 
Urola, from ur ola 'hut of the water', coastal river in Azpeitia and Zumaia (Spain)
Urrobi, from ur hobi 'water hole', tributary of the Irati River, in Navarre
Ugaran, from ur haran 'water valley', in Zugarramurdi
Uhabia, from ur habia 'water hole', coastal river in Bidart (France)
Uhaneko erreka, right tributary of the Nive in Cambo-les-Bains
Uhanki, brook in Saint-Michel
Urontho (= Urondo) tributary of Ur Handia between Jatxou and Villefranque
Ur Handia 'big brook', brooks in Larrau and tributary of the Ardanabia in Hasparren
Ur Gaitza (Urgatxa) 'dangerous brook', tributary of the Ardanabia in Urcuit
Ur Ona (Uroneko erreka) 'good water', brook in Ahetze
Ur Xuria (Urtxuria) 'white water', tributary of the Irati River from the Larrau Pass
Ur Beltza, Ur Beltxa 'black water', brook in Aldudes
Urepel 'tepid water', commune of the Pyrénées-Atlantiques
Urcuray, river and village of the commune of Hasparren
and probably:
Urioko erreka, tributary of the Figareliko erreka in Sare (Uri, tributary of the Harane in Sare).
Oria, coastal river in Lasarte-Oria.
Urlo, tributary of the Haltzabala from Espelette and Souraïde.
Urma, tributary of the Nivelle from Ainhoa.

Hydronymy
Basque toponymy
Place name element etymologies